Pabarupys (formerly) is a village in Kėdainiai district municipality, in Kaunas County, in central Lithuania. According to the 2011 census, the village was uninhabited. The Barupė Hydrographical Sanctuary is located nearby.

In the beginning of the 20th century Pabarupys was an estate.

Demography

References

Villages in Kaunas County
Kėdainiai District Municipality